Phetchaburi Province Stadium is a multi-purpose stadium in Phetchaburi Province, Thailand. It is currently used mostly for football matches and is the home stadium of Phetchaburi F.C. The stadium holds 3,500 people.

Football venues in Thailand
Multi-purpose stadiums in Thailand
Buildings and structures in Phetchaburi province
Sport in Phetchaburi province